Affairs of the Art is a 2021 British-Canadian traditional animation short film directed by Joanna Quinn and written by Les Mills. Quinn also co-stars as the voice of Beverly.

The film has been screened at Film Festivals worldwide since February 2021 including Palm Springs ShortFest in the US, winning 26 International Awards including prizes in Clermont Ferrand International Short Film Festival and Annecy International Animation Film Festival. It has been nominated for the Academy Award for Best Animated Short Film for the 94th Academy Awards and nominated for BAFTA Award for Best Short Animation. The short was part of the world touring screening The Animation Showcase 2021.

The short film follows the character of Beryl and her eccentric family. Beryl, the working-class heroine, first appeared in the 1987 animated short film Girls Night Out, Body Beautiful (1990) and Dreams & Desires: Family Ties (2006). Affairs of the Art focuses on Beryl and her family's fixations and Beryl's own obsession with drawing and her determination to become an artiste of note.

Cast 
 Menna Trussler as Beryl
 Brendan Charleson as Ifor/Colin/Lenin/Interviewer
 Joanna Quinn as Beverly
 Mali Ann Rees as Mum/Edie

Production 
The film is co-created between Joanna Quinn and Les Mills. Quinn is the film's director, storyboard artist and lead animator and Mills wrote the screen play, did the colour design and produced the film. It is their first new film featuring the lead character of Beryl since 2007. They began planning another Beryl film straight after their last film Dreams & Desires: Family Ties, but it took 15 years before Beryl returned to the screen in a new film mainly because of major commitments to producing many TV commercials in the intervening years. The 16-minute-film was traditionally animated on a lightbox and took more than 24000 hand drawn frames (fps) to produce. The animation drawings were scanned into the computer, coloured in TVPaint and finally composited in After Effects. In this film there's a lot of lip sync, with a focus on breaking down the patterns of the lips movements.

Accolades 
Since its launch, the film has been selected in more than 65 festival selections around the world:

References

External links 
 
 Affairs of the Art trailer on YouTube

2021 films
2021 short films
2021 animated films
British animated short films
Canadian animated short films
National Film Board of Canada animated short films
2020s English-language films
2020s Canadian films
2020s British films